Millimetrik is the stage name of Pascal Asselin, a Canadian electronic musician from Quebec City, Quebec. He is most noted as a two-time Félix Award winner for Electronic Album of the Year, winning at the 41st Félix Awards in 2019 for Make It Last Forever and at the 44th Félix Awards in 2022 for Sun-Drenched.

Discography

Albums
Northwest Passage's New Era - 2008
Mystique Drums - 2010
Read Between the Rhymes - 2012
Lonely Lights - 2014
Fog Dreams - 2016
Make It Last Forever - 2019
Sun-Drenched - 2021

EPs
Cities - 2006
Keys - 2008
Afterglow - 2010
Around You - 2011
Influences - 2011
Remix the Rhymes - 2013
Remixed Lights - 2014
Sour Mash - 2017

References

21st-century Canadian male musicians
Canadian electronic musicians
Musicians from Quebec City
French Quebecers
Living people
Year of birth missing (living people)